Kép–Hạ Long railway is the railway line serving the country of Vietnam.

References

See also 
 List of railway lines in Vietnam

Railway lines in Vietnam
Transport in Vietnam
Articles containing video clips